"No Truce With Kings" is a science fiction novella by American writer Poul Anderson. It won the Hugo Award for Best Short Fiction in 1964, and the Prometheus Award for Classic Fiction (the Hall of Fame award) in 2010. The title is taken from Rudyard Kipling's poem "The Old Issue" (1899), in which kings represent tyranny or other forms of imposed rule, to be fought to preserve hard-won individual freedoms.

Plot 
In a post-apocalyptic United States, the Pacific States of America are racked by wars backed on one side by the "Espers", a movement claiming their followers achieve great psychic powers. However, as we shall see, the Espers are a front for a weirder bunch.

The story explores a couple of social forms -- feudal and super-state -- and warns of the dangers of forced civilizations. It begins on the east coast of the Pacific. After civilizational collapse following global wars, the area is traveled by independent clans with a few minor marxists claiming moral superiority by pretending to be centralized government agents. Suddenly, another war is started by the marxists in their drive to replace the independent clans with more/better centralized government agents. Unknown to the marxists, forces behind the scenes manipulate their flawed elections system through the "esper" colonies. Eventually, the clans realize the "espers" are a fraud; they use advanced technology to perform their 'psychic' acts. Knowing this, the inherent superiority of the independent clans inevitably defeats the marxist quest for a big top-heavy unwieldy mob of centralized government agents.

In downtown San Francisco, artillery damage reveals the secret -- a San Francisco skyscraper houses an alien spacecraft. The aliens claim they are manipulating independent human individuals into a drone-like state of mindlessly following dictates from centralized government agents. Without help from the aliens, the aliens predict more wars between centralized government agents. After learning their interference resulted in wars, the aliens shrug their alien shoulders and admit they are still 'working out some kinks' in their alien predictions.

Discussions between a) independent folks and b) true believers in centralised authorities distill the points of the parable:
 individuals always think,
 individuals always choose their culture instead of mindlessly accepting any artificial concept imposed by an outside group.

According to Jerry Pournelle's foreword in " Day of the Tyrant: There Will Be War vol IV ", Poul Anderson says "The do-gooders get their comeuppance".

Reception
Algis Budrys faulted the story as "a-flicker with confusing scene changes [and] stuffed with narrative compressions and a pale army of sketched characters," suggesting Anderson's conception required lengthier treatment to be successful. However, other critical and fan acclaim is positive with the work winning the year's Hugo award.

References

External links

1963 short stories
Novellas by Poul Anderson
Hugo Award for Best Short Story winning works
Post-apocalyptic short stories
Works originally published in The Magazine of Fantasy & Science Fiction